Blanca Inés Durán Hernández (born 16 June 1971), is an industrial engineer and former Mayor of Chapinero. She is an openly lesbian politician and activist.

References

External links
 Chapinero's Government Site: Mayor's Profile

1971 births
Living people
Politicians from Bogotá
Colombian LGBT rights activists
University of Los Andes (Colombia) alumni
Academic staff of the University of Los Andes (Colombia)
Colombian industrial engineers
Alternative Democratic Pole politicians
Colombian women in politics
Colombian LGBT politicians
Lesbian politicians
Mayors of places in Colombia
Women mayors of places in Colombia
LGBT mayors
21st-century Colombian LGBT people